Daroli Kalan (Daroli Kalan & Daroli Khurd) is a village in Jalandhar - I in Jalandhar district of Punjab State, India. Kalan is Persian language word which means Big and Khurd is Persian word which means small when two villages have same name then it is distinguished with Kalan means Big and Khurd means Small used with Village Name.
The village is administrated by Sarpanch an elected representative of the village.

Demography 
, The village has a total number of 1124 houses and the population of 4767 of which 2320 are males while 2447 are females.  According to the report published by Census India in 2011, out of the total population of the village 1220 people are from Schedule Caste and the village does not have any Schedule Tribe population so far.

See also
List of villages in India

References

External links 
 Tourism of Punjab
 Census of Punjab

Villages in Jalandhar district